KRSV may refer to:

 KRSV (AM), a radio station (1210 AM) licensed to Afton, Wyoming, United States
 KRSV-FM, a radio station (98.7 FM) licensed to Afton, Wyoming, United States